"Super Love" is a song performed by Johnny Gill. It is the opening track on his first eponymous album and was issued as the album's first single. The song peaked at #29 on the Billboard R&B chart in 1983.

Chart positions

References

External links
 
 

1983 debut singles
Cotillion Records singles
Johnny Gill songs
Song recordings produced by Freddie Perren
Songs written by Freddie Perren
1983 songs
Songs written by Elliot Wolff
Songs written by Keni St. Lewis